Lewis Webster Jones (June 11, 1899 – September 10, 1975) was an economist, and the President of Bennington College from 1941-1947, the University of Arkansas from 1947 to 1951 and of Rutgers University from 1951 to 1958.

Biography
He was born in Emerson, Nebraska, and spent his youth in Portland, Oregon. Jones received his undergraduate degree from Reed College, and later earned his PhD from the Brookings Graduate School of Economics and Government (now the Brookings Institution). Jones then did post-doctoral work at Columbia University, the London School of Economics, the University of Cambridge, the University of Geneva and the Graduate Institute of International Studies in Geneva. During his studies in Europe, he served as an economist on the staff of the League of Nations. He then joined the faculty of Bennington College in 1932 where he served as president from 1941 to 1947. He served from 1947 to 1951 as the 12th president of the University of Arkansas. At Arkansas, he began the process of rebuilding the University after World War II. New graduate programs began, expanded and new buildings added. Most notable were the Fine Arts and Law school buildings. In 1951 he was appointed the fifteenth President of Rutgers University.

During his tenure as Rutgers president, Jones oversaw the completion of the university's transformation into the State University in 1956, and massive construction efforts across the university's College Avenue, Busch, Cook and Douglass campuses. The Graduate School of Social Work, ranked as one of the finest in the United States, and the Graduate School of Library Science (now part of the School of Communication, Information and Library Science), and the Eagleton Institute of Politics were established during his tenure.

Jones resigned as president of Rutgers in 1958, to accept the presidency of the National Conference of Christians and Jews. In 1965 he retired to Sarasota, Florida where he lived until his death on September 10, 1975.

References

Further reading
Image and Reflection: A Pictorial History of the University of Arkansas; Ethel Simpson, U of Ark. Press, 1991.

Leaders of the University of Arkansas
Presidents of Rutgers University
1899 births
1975 deaths
Reed College alumni
Graduate Institute of International and Development Studies alumni
Infectious disease deaths in Florida
Presidents of Bennington College
Presidents of the University of Arkansas System
20th-century American academics